The General Dutch Printing Union (ANGB) was a trade union representing workers in the printing industry in the Netherlands.

The union was founded in 1945, when the General Dutch Graphic Union merged with the Dutch Litho-, Photo- and Chemographers' Union, the General Dutch Typographers' Union, and the Dutch Union of Managers in the Graphic Industry.  Like all its predecessors, it affiliated to the Dutch Association of Trade Unions (NVV).  In 1981, it had 32,743 members.

In 1976, the NVV merged with its Catholic counterpart, to form the Dutch Federation of Trade Unions, and in 1982, the ANGB similarly merged with the Dutch Catholic Printing Union, to form the Printing and Paper Union.

References

Printing trade unions
Trade unions established in 1945
Trade unions disestablished in 1982
Trade unions in the Netherlands